Berlin is an unincorporated community in northern Florence Township, Williams County, Ohio, United States. It is located in the northwest corner of Ohio, approximately two miles from Indiana and six miles from Michigan. It lies along State Route 49, a short distance south of the Ohio Turnpike.

It is located at latitude 41° 36' 34" north and longitude 84° 45' 16" west. The elevation is 941 feet above sea level.

See also 
Berlin, Holmes County, Ohio

Unincorporated communities in Williams County, Ohio
Unincorporated communities in Ohio